Gates County is a county located in the northeastern portion of the U.S. state of North Carolina, on the border with Virginia. As of the 2020 census, the population was 10,478. Its county seat is Gatesville. Gates County is included in the Virginia Beach-Norfolk-Newport News, VA-NC Metropolitan Statistical Area. It is part of the Albemarle Sound area of the Inner Banks.

History
As in other areas along the waterways, Indians lived in this region for thousands of years, with different groups leaving and new ones migrating to settle again. They created settlements, increasingly permanent, along the Chowan River.

At the time of European contact, the Chowanoke were the largest tribe in North Carolina of the many in the Algonquian language family and it occupied most of the territory along the river. After suffering dramatic population decreases by the early 17th century due to infectious diseases from Europe, which they had no immunity to, most of the survivors were pushed out by encroaching Tuscarora, an Iroquoian-speaking tribe.

In 1585, the Ralph Lane Colony explored the Chowan River at least as far up as present-day Winton. In 1622, the John Pory Colony led an expedition from Virginia to the Chowan River. (Pory was secretary of the Province of Virginia.) In 1629, Sir Robert Heath was granted a patent to settle Carolina. This patent embraced Gates County.

The Chowanoke waged war against the encroaching colonists in 1644 but they ultimately lost. During the 1650s, colonists from Virginia began to move increasingly into the Albemarle Sound region. Colonel Drew and Roger Green led an expedition into the Albemarle area. The first English settlement in Gates County was established near Corapeake in 1660. In 1670, Colonel Henry Baker of Nansemond County obtained a grant of land for  near Buckland. In 1672, Quaker leader George Fox visited Gates County. He described the county as barren.

The Chowanoke renewed their effort to expel the colonists, warring from 1675 to 1677. Following the English defeat of these forces, in 1677 they created a Chowanoke Indian Reservation, the first within the present-day United States. The 11,360-acre reservation was established at the Chowanoke settlement between Bennett's Creek and Catherine Creek in Gates.

From 1684 to 1722 Gates County was a part of the Chowan precinct. In 1711, the Society for the Propagation of the Gospel established an Anglican school for Chowanoke and other local Indians at Sarum, with a Mr. Marshburn as the teacher. During the 18th century, the Chowanoke lost most of their land, selling off portions to help the tribe survive. Men's names were recorded in tribal conveyances, and many descendants can trace their ancestry to these families. Some members began to intermarry with other tribes, such as the nearby Meherrin people, as well as Englishmen and Africans.

In 1738, local settlers created a mail route from Suffolk, Virginia to Corapeake and Edenton, North Carolina. The stagecoach route crossed the Chowan River at Barfield.

Gates County was organized in 1779 from parts of Chowan, Hertford, and Perquimans counties. It was named for General Horatio Gates, who had commanded the victorious American colonial forces at the Battle of Saratoga in 1777.

1800s
In 1806, white settlers established Middle Swamp Baptist Church as the first Baptist church in Gates County. This accompanied the Second Great Awakening revival in the South after the American Revolution, which was led by Baptist and Methodist preachers. In 1811, Savages United Methodist Church was established, the oldest Methodist Church in Gates County. Both denominations preached both to enslaved blacks as well as white residents, and they accepted slaves and free blacks as members and sometimes even as preachers.

The Chowanoke Indians lost their last 30-acre plot of communal land in 1821. Although Gates County residents were mostly yeomen farmers who owned few slaves, the South overall still had a slave society which classified people as either black or white. However, the Native Americans managed to maintain their culture and absorbed people of other races in their matrilineal kinship systems. The Chowanoke were increasingly classified as free people of color, as where free blacks and mulattos.

In 1825, the Marquis de Lafayette travelled through Gates County and was entertained at Pipkin's Inn. The town of Gatesville was incorporated in 1830. The old courthouse was built in 1836. Its oldest remaining component is its Federal-style bell, which the town had purchased in 1781.

According to the 1850 census, only 15 of the county's 717 farms produced cotton. In 1851, the Reynoldson Academy was established. Free people of color, who were often of mixed race, organized New Hope Baptist Church in 1859.

Port of Hamburg
County residents worked to develop better connections to major ports. It was Gates County's water route to the major port of Norfolk, running straight east for  through the Dismal Swamp, from a landing on Daniels Road in Gates County to the Dismal Swamp Canal that led to Norfolk.

The Cross Canal is no longer a through route, as it was blocked by hurricanes that toppled trees and blocked access. Until the late 20th century, sportsmen in small boats used the Gates County end, at the site of the town of Hamburg, to enter the swamp.

Civil War
Prior to the American Civil War, most of Gates County was covered with virgin timber. In 1861, A. J. Walton was chosen as Gates County's representative to the North Carolina secession convention. After North Carolina voted to secede, the "Gates Guard" company was formed raised to protect its borders. It was soon joined by a second company, the "Gates Minutemen". However, Gates County's greatest contribution was in supplying food to the Confederate States Army. General William P. Roberts would become the youngest general. Brigadier General Laurence S. Baker, another Gates County native, lost an arm in the war.

Jack Fairless of Gates County was dishonorably discharged from the Confederate army for stealing. He returned home and formed an outlaw band known as the "Buffaloes". Made up of draft dodgers, Confederate deserters, and renegades from both armies, Fairless's Buffaloes terrorized the old men, women, children who were trying to keep their farms going. Fairless was finally killed by his own men when they turned on him.

Fort Dillard was a Confederate post in Gates county, though the county was sometimes subject to Union raids. The story of the "Ellis Girls" is told even today. While fishing in the Chowan River, the sisters saw a Union gunboat on its way upriver to attack Winton. Union soldiers from the gunboat seized the girls and kept them prisoner on until they had finished burning down the town.

In 1878, Jethro Goodman introduced peanuts into Gates County. Thad Eure,  a Secretary of State, was born here in 1899.

1900s
On May 9, 1925, the first bridge opened across the Chowan River between Gates and Hertford counties. In 1925, Hwy 158 opened between Gates and Pasquotank, constructed through the Great Dismal Swamp.

In the 1930s Gates County still had no paved roads and few people owned automobiles. Most families grew their own produce and some raised livestock. In 1935 during the Great Depression, the Sunbury Ruritan Club was established, the first and oldest Ruritan chapter in the state. The civic organization of men was active in improving the town: "in its first three months..., the Sunbury Ruritan Club sponsored a Community Agriculture Fair; contacted NC DOT to place a stop signal at the Edenton-to-Suffolk Road; purchased school books for needy children; paid one-half the cost of new shades for the school; had the school piano tuned; and later made a contribution to the school’s basketball team and sponsored a move to hire a police officer to serve the community."

Beckford Junction was a train switch in the city that enabled trains to go to Suffolk, Elizabeth City, or Edenton. Beckford Junction was abandoned in 1940. The last passenger train serving Gates County ended in 1954. That year the Gates County Historical Society was established.

In 1973 A.B. Coleman donated  of land in the Millpond to the state. This was the basis of the Merchants Millpond State Park.

In 1984 a tornado struck Gates County, killing two people and causing an estimated $500,000 to $5,000,000 worth of damage. Hurricane Floyd hit Gates County in 1999.

2000s
In September 2007 Gates County was chosen as a potential site for a US Navy landing field in the northeastern part of the state.

In 2014 Delois Chavis, a Chowanoke descendant, worked with other Chowanoke to buy 146 acres of the tribe's former reservation land near Bennett's Creek. She had grown up knowing of her Native American identity from her parents and grandparents, and is among those who want to revive the tribe. They have organized as the Chowanoke Indian Tribe, and plan to build a cultural center on the land to help their efforts.

Geography

National protected land

Great Dismal Swamp 

The counties of Gates, Perquimans, Camden and Currituck contain sixty percent of the Great Dismal swamp. In 1973, Union Camp donated the land which it owned in the swamp to the Nature Conservancy. The Conservancy next donated the land to the Department of The Interior, and the Great Dismal Swamp National Wildlife Refuge was created.

State and local protected lands 
 Chowan Swamp State Natural Area
 Merchants Millpond State Park
In 1811, the Norfleet family built the first dam at the millpond. The mill ground corn. In 1856 the Millpond was sold and became known as Williams Millpond.

In 1910, Charles Lawrence purchased the Millpond. It became known as Merchants Millpond. In the 1960s A. B. Coleman purchased the Millpond. In 1973, A.B. Coleman donated  of the land to North Carolina under the condition that it was to become a state park. Today Merchants Millpond occupies .

Major water body 
 Chowan River

Adjacent counties
 City of Suffolk, Virginia - north
 Camden County - northeast
 Pasquotank County - east
 Perquimans County - south
 Chowan County - south
 Hertford County - west

Major highways

Demographics

2020 census

As of the 2020 United States census, there were 10,478 people, 4,638 households, and 3,205 families residing in the county.

2010 census
As of the census of 2010, there were 12,197 people, 3,901 households, and 2,933 families residing in the county. The population density was 31 people per square mile (12/km2). There were 4,389 housing units at an average density of 13 per square mile (5/km2). The racial makeup of the county was 63.7% White, 33.2% Black or African American, 0.5% Native American, 0.1% Asian, 0.1% Pacific Islander, 0.6% from other races, and 1.8% from two or more races; 1.4% of the population were Hispanic or Latino of any race.

There were 3,901 households, out of which 34.20% had children under the age of 18 living with them, 57.20% were married couples living together, 13.30% had a female householder with no husband present, and 24.80% were non-families; 21.70% of all households were made up of individuals, and 11.30% had someone living alone who was 65 years of age or older. The average household size was 2.66 and the average family size was 3.09.

In the county, the population was spread out, with 26.70% under the age of 18, 6.10% from 18 to 24, 29.10% from 25 to 44, 23.70% from 45 to 64, and 14.40% who were 65 years of age or older. The median age was 38 years. For every 100 females there were 96.20 males. For every 100 females age 18 and over, there were 92.50 males.

The median income for a household in the county was $35,647, and the median income for a family was $41,511. Males had a median income of $32,227 versus $21,014 for females. The per capita income for the county was $15,963. About 14.50% of families and 17.00% of the population were below the poverty line, including 17.90% of those under age 18 and 26.20% of those age 65 or over.

Government and politics
Gates County had previously supported a Republican in federal elections only in Richard Nixon’s 1972 landslide, but broke this tradition to support Donald Trump in 2016 and 2020.

Economy
Most of Gates County's revenue comes from property taxes on personal property, with a small percentage coming from commercial sources.

Industries
The main industries are agriculture and forest products. Heritage tourism and recreation are increasing in importance.

Education
Gates County Schools has five schools ranging from pre-kindergarten to twelfth grade. Those five schools are separated into one high school (Gates County Senior High School), one middle school, and three elementary schools.

Gates County is quite prideful in its high school athletics. Gates County High School has won a state championship in football, in 1971. That team was led by legendary coach, Pete Smoak. Most recently, the football team has been successful in the Tar-Roanoke Conference, and winning the conference in 2010. The Red Barons galvanized the entire northeastern part of North Carolina, as it went on its improbable run, winning 11 games in a row, and going undefeated in the conference. This team was led by current head coach, Matt Biggy. It is home to many athletes, including Thomas Smith, formerly of the Buffalo Bills, and Walter Smith I, formerly of the Toronto Argonauts.

Rosenwald Schools

Rosenwald Schools were schools set up by money from the Rosenwald Fund. This fund was created in 1917 by Julius Rosenwald, Chicago businessman and head of Sears Corporation to encourage construction of schools, mostly in the South, for rural black children who were underserved by the segregated public school system. The fund required communities to raise matching funds, including the use of public money and the support of school boards. At the time, the school boards were run by whites. Blacks had been disfranchised throughout the South since the turn of the century, so services for them were typically underfunded.

Black communities strongly supported the schools, raising money, and sometimes contributing both land and labor. In effect they taxed themselves twice to support education. The schools were built to model designs developed by architects at Tuskegee University, a historically black college. The Rosenwald Fund stimulated the construction of more than 4,977 schools and related structures for African-American children before the program ended in 1948 when the fund was depleted.

Seven Rosenwald Schools built in communities in Gates County. In some areas, such schools have been converted to community centers and other uses.
 Corapeake (still standing)
 Reid's Grove (still standing)
 T.S. Cooper
 Hobbsvile
 Reynoldson
 Sunbury
 Roduco

Communities

Town
 Gatesville (county seat and largest town)

Census-designated place
 Sunbury

Unincorporated communities
 Buckland
 Corapeake
 Eason Crossroads
 Eure
 Gates
 Hoflers Fork
 Holly Grove
 Hobbsville
 Mintonsville
 Roduco
 Sandy Cross
 Selwin
 Sunbury
 Tarheel
 White Oak

Townships
 Gatesville
 Hall
 Reynoldson
 Haslett
 Holly Grove
 Hunters Mill
 Mintonsville

Post Offices
 Corapeake
 Sunbury
 Hobbsville
 Gatesville
 Roduco
 Eure
 Gates

See also
 List of counties in North Carolina
 National Register of Historic Places listings in Gates County, North Carolina
 North Carolina State Parks
 Meherrin Indian Tribe, state-recognized tribe that resides in the county

References

External links

 
 

 
1779 establishments in North Carolina
Populated places established in 1779